RazakSAT is a Malaysian Earth observation satellite carrying a high-resolution camera. It was launched into low Earth orbit on 14 July 2009. It was placed into a near-equatorial orbit that presents many imaging opportunities for the equatorial region. It weighs over three times as much as TiungSAT-1 and carries a high resolution Earth observation camera. Developed in conjunction with Satrec Initiative, the satellite's low inclination orbit (9 degrees) brought it over Malaysia a dozen or more times per day. This was intended to provide greatly increased coverage of Malaysia, compared to most other Earth observation satellites. An audit report released in October 2011 revealed that the satellite had failed after only 1 year of operation.

RazakSAT was the first and only operational satellite to be put in orbit by SpaceX's Falcon 1.

Background
This satellite is Malaysia's second remote sensing satellite after TiungSAT-1.

Originally called MACSAT, RazakSAT's payload is mainly electro-optical, carrying a Medium-sized Aperture Camera (MAC) which is a pushbroom camera with five linear detectors (one panchromatic, four multi-spectral) weighing approximately 50 kg. The entire satellite weighs at about 180 kg.

Launch
SpaceX launched RazakSAT at 03:35 UTC on 14 July 2009 using a Falcon 1 rocket. This was the fifth flight of a Falcon 1, and like the previous flights lift-off was from Omelek Island in the Kwajalein Atoll. At 05:25 UTC Elon Musk, founder and CEO of SpaceX, told a reporter the launch had been a success. "We nailed the orbit to well within target parameters...pretty much a bullseye." Musk said.

Operations
RazakSAT's mission plan was carried out by engineers from Astronautic Technology Sdn Bhd (ATSB).
This was especially important because Malaysia is usually covered by the equatorial cloud bands. Normal sun-synchronous optical satellites, which may re-visit an area only once every 7 days, will almost never be able to see the ground during their pass. As a result, much optical satellite imagery of Malaysia have more than 50% cloud cover within the image's footprint.

Razaksat, on the other hand, revisited some parts of Malaysian territory every 90 minutes, potentially maximising its ability to exploit gaps in the clouds.

RazakSAT, equipped with a high resolution Medium-Sized Aperture Camera (MAC), achieved the intended Near-Equatorial Low Earth Orbit (NEqO) at 685 km altitude and a 9 degree inclination. It was expected to provide high resolution images of Malaysia that can be applied to land management, resource development and forestry.

Be that as it may, the NEqO orbit does have 3 distinct disadvantages. Analysis through the commercially available Satellite Tool Kit (STK) software had shown that the orbit revisit over Malaysia was found to have a maximum peak of 2-4 overpasses per day during daylight hours (from 8 am to 6:30 pm) to a period of 6 consecutive days without any usable daylight overpasses. The second disadvantage is that most imagery acquired through the NEqO orbit are not usable through a remote sensing perspective as the NEqO orbit is not a sun-synchronous orbit, a vital criterion for monitoring and analysis work. Thirdly, it was found that the NEqO orbit exposes the satellite to the South Atlantic Anomaly (SAA) phenomenon on every orbit it takes around the earth unlike the polar orbit, near-polar or sun-synchronous orbits, thereby further increasing the risk of radiation damage to the satellite.

Although it was originally intended as a Research & Development (R&D) project but it was later announced for commercial purposes in 2009,
the aim of the RazakSAT project was asserted as a Research & Development (R&D) Project in 2010.

During its operations after its launch in 2009, it was discovered that the RazakSAT satellite could not achieve its targeted pointing accuracy of within 1 km of its intended target. The Malaysian English newspaper The Star, quoting from the Malaysian Government Auditor-General's Report 2010, reported that the images that were acquired by the RazakSAT satellite was found to be 37 km off their intended target.

As a result of the pointing error, all of the over 1,328 images acquired by the satellite were rendered unusable. Despite a promise of delivering MAC images by 2010, as of the end of 2011, the operators have not released any images. Efforts to fix the problems with the satellite were terminated in December 2010.

Specifications 
The major specification of RazakSAT, as provided by the satellites' builder and operator (ATSB) in February 2010, are:

Satellite bus
The satellite bus used for RazakSAT was jointly developed by ATSB and Satrec Initiative, a commercial satellite manufacturer in Korea. Satrec Initiative markets the bus system as the "SI-200".

See also

 DubaiSat-1

References

External links

 https://web.archive.org/web/20090504213727/http://www.mosti.gov.my/mosti/
 RazakSAT first images. Click MOSTI Gallery > Year 2009 > Galeri Gambar Pelancaran RazakSAT

Earth imaging satellites
Spacecraft launched in 2009
SpaceX commercial payloads
Satellites of Malaysia